Attorney for the Defense is a 1932 American pre-Code crime film directed by Irving Cummings and starring Edmund Lowe, Evelyn Brent, and Constance Cummings.

Cast
 Edmund Lowe as William J. Burton
 Evelyn Brent as Val Lorraine
 Constance Cummings as Ruth Barry
 Don Dillaway as Paul Wallace
 Douglas Haig as Paul Wallace as a Boy
 Dorothy Peterson as Mrs. Wallace
 Bradley Page as Nick Quinn  Kramer
 Nat Pendleton as Mugg Malone
 Dwight Frye as James Wallace
 Wallis Clark as District Attorney James A. Crowell
 Clarence Muse as Jefferson Q. Leffingwell

References

External links

1932 films
1932 crime drama films
American crime drama films
American black-and-white films
Columbia Pictures films
Films directed by Irving Cummings
Films with screenplays by Jo Swerling
1930s American films